Sven Vilhem Nykvist (3 December 1922 – 20 September 2006) was a Swedish cinematographer. He worked on over 120 films, but is known especially for his work with director Ingmar Bergman. He won Academy Awards for his work on two Bergman films, Cries and Whispers (1972) and Fanny and Alexander (1982), and the Independent Spirit Award for Best Cinematography for The Unbearable Lightness of Being. He is also known for his collaborations with Woody Allen for Crimes and Misdemeanors, Another Woman, New York Stories, and Celebrity and Andrei Tarkovsky on The Sacrifice.

His work is generally noted for its naturalism and simplicity. He is considered by many to be one of the greatest cinematographers of all time. In 2003, Nykvist was judged one of history's ten most influential cinematographers in a survey conducted by the International Cinematographers Guild.

Life and career
Nykvist was born in Moheda, Kronobergs län, Sweden. His parents were Lutheran missionaries who spent most of their lives in the Belgian Congo, so Nykvist was raised by relatives in Sweden and saw his parents rarely. His father was a keen amateur photographer of African wildlife, whose activities may have sparked Nykvist's interest in the visual arts.

A talented athlete in his youth, Nykvist's first cinematic effort was to film himself taking a high jump, to improve his jumping technique. After a year at the Municipal School for Photographers in Stockholm, he entered the Swedish film industry at the age of 19.

In 1941, he became an assistant cameraman at Sandrews studio, working on The Poor Millionaire. He moved to Italy in 1943 to work at Cinecittà Studios, returning to Sweden two years later. In 1945, aged 23, he became a full-fledged cinematographer, with his first solo credit on The Children from Frostmo Mountain.

He worked on many small Swedish films for the next few years, and spent some time with his parents in Africa filming wildlife, footage which was later released as a documentary entitled In the Footsteps of the Witch Doctor (also known as Under the Southern Cross).

Back in Sweden, he began to work with the director Ingmar Bergman on Sawdust and Tinsel (US: The Naked Night, 1953). He was one of three cinematographers to work on the film, the others being Gunnar Fischer and Hilding Bladh.

Nykvist would eventually become Bergman's regular cinematographer. He worked as sole cameraman on Bergman's Oscar-winning films The Virgin Spring (1959) and Through a Glass Darkly (1960). He revolutionised the way faces are shot in close-up with Bergman's psychologic drama Persona (1966).

After working with other Swedish directors, including Alf Sjöberg on The Judge (1960) and Mai Zetterling on Loving Couples (1964), he then worked in the United States and elsewhere, on: Richard Fleischer's The Last Run (1971); Louis Malle's Black Moon (1975) and Pretty Baby (1978); Roman Polanski's The Tenant (1976); Jan Troell's Hurricane (1979); Bob Rafelson's version of The Postman Always Rings Twice (1981); Norman Jewison's Agnes of God (1985); Woody Allen's Another Woman (1988), Crimes and Misdemeanors (1989) and Celebrity (1998); Richard Attenborough's Chaplin (1992); Nora Ephron's Sleepless in Seattle (1993); and Lasse Hallström's What's Eating Gilbert Grape (1993) and Something to Talk About (1995).

Nykvist won the Academy Award for Best Cinematography for two of his films: Cries and Whispers (1972), and Fanny and Alexander (1982), both of which were Bergman films. Nykvist said that his favorite cinematography was Fanny and Alexander.  At the 9th Guldbagge Awards in 1973 he won the Special Achievement award for his work on Cries and Whispers. He was also nominated for a Cinematography Oscar for The Unbearable Lightness of Being (1988), and in the category of Best Foreign Language Film for The Ox (1991), in which he directed Max von Sydow and Liv Ullmann.

Nykvist won a special prize at the Cannes Film Festival for his work on The Sacrifice (1986), the last film directed by Andrei Tarkovsky, who by then was in exile from his native Russia. He was the first European cinematographer to join the American Society of Cinematographers, and received a Lifetime Achievement Award from the ASC in 1996.

His ex-wife, Ulrika, died in 1982. Nykvist's career was brought to an abrupt end in 1998 when he was diagnosed with aphasia; he died in 2006, aged 83. He wrote three books, including Curtain Call published in 1999.

His son Carl-Gustaf Nykvist directed a 1999 documentary about him, Light Keeps Me Company.

Selected filmography

Awards and nominations

Academy Awards

BAFTA Awards

National Society of Film Critics

British Society of Cinematographers

New York Film Critics Circle

Los Angeles Film Critics Association

American Society of Cinematographers

Other Awards

Legacy
The Sven Nykvist Cinematography Award is awarded annually at the Gothenburg Film Festival, presented in collaboration with the Sven Nykvist Cinematography Foundation.

References

In-depth interview with Nykvist from 1984 on working with Bergman
Obituary, The Daily Telegraph, 20 September 2006
Obituary, New York Times'', 21 September 2006

External links

1922 births
2006 deaths
Best Cinematographer Academy Award winners
Best Cinematography BAFTA Award winners
César Award winners
Independent Spirit Award winners
People from Alvesta Municipality
Swedish cinematographers
Swedish Lutherans
20th-century Lutherans